SS Thomas Sim Lee was a Liberty ship built in the United States during World War II. She was named after Thomas Sim Lee, an American planter and statesman of Frederick County, Maryland. He was the second Governor of Maryland, serving twice, from 1779 to 1783 and again from 1792 to 1794. Thomas Sim Lee also served as a delegate of Maryland in the Congress of the Confederation in 1783 and was a member of the House of Delegates in 1787.

Construction
Thomas Sim Lee was laid down on 23 September 1942, under a Maritime Commission (MARCOM) contract, MCE hull 921, by the Bethlehem-Fairfield Shipyard, Baltimore, Maryland; she was sponsored by Miss Jean Elizabeth O'Donovan, a direct descendant of Thomas Sim Lee, and was launched on 24 October 1942.

History
She was allocated to Agwilines Inc., on 31 October 1942. On 22 May 1950, she was first laid up in the National Defense Reserve Fleet, Beaumont, Texas. She was put back in service briefly during the Korean War, and laid up again in Beumont, on 23 April 1952. On 9 June 1972, she was sold for scrapping to Andy International, Inc., for $42,555. She was removed from the fleet on 7 July 1972.

References

Bibliography

 
 
 
 

 

Liberty ships
Ships built in Baltimore
1942 ships
Beaumont Reserve Fleet